Bailey Ann Noble (born October 13, 1990) is an American actress. She played Adilyn Bellefleur, the half-fairy daughter of sheriff Andy Bellefleur, on HBO's vampire drama series True Blood (2013–2014), and Anna Assaoui in the 2015 remake of Martyrs.

Filmography

Film

Television

Web

Music videos
 "Weekend" (2014) by Priory

References

External links
 

1990 births
Living people
American television actresses
American film actresses
21st-century American actresses
Actresses from Pennsylvania
People from Bethlehem, Pennsylvania
Saucon Valley High School alumni